The Night of the Grizzly is a 1966 Western film starring Clint Walker, Martha Hyer, Keenan Wynn, Jack Elam and Nancy Kulp. Directed by Joseph Pevney and written by Warren Douglas, the film was released by Paramount Pictures on April 20, 1966. It was Pevney's final feature film.

The film's plot centers around Marshall "Big Jim" Cole (Clint Walker), who inherits land in Wyoming and trades his dangerous lawman's life for the life of a rancher. But he barely gets his family settled when new dangers plague them – a treacherous grizzly bear is on a murderous rampage; angry neighbors covet Cole's property, and an outlaw he once sent to prison seeks revenge.

The film contains beautiful scenery from Holcomb Valley, Big Bear Lake, California, United States and Big Bear Valley, San Bernardino National Forest, California, United States.

Plot 
Jim Cole, his wife Angela, along with their children Charlie and Gypsy, niece Meg, and his friend and former deputy Sam Potts arrive in a small Wyoming town. Jim has inherited a ranch from his late uncle and decided to give up his former job as a lawman and become a rancher instead. In town, they meet Mr. Benson the banker, who tells them about a $675 mortgage on the property. Jim initially hesitates to take the land title, since it would take nearly all their savings, but when told that another rancher Jed Curry wants the land for himself, he relents. Benson then explains that Jed initially owned the property but lost it to Jim's late uncle in a card game and wants it back. Jim finally agrees to keep the land when Mr. Benson hands him the money/landowner's bill and settles the mortgage.

As they leave the bank, the Coles encounter Jed, who acts like he is happy for the family but is actually planning to get the ranch by any means possible. In the countryside, they arrive at the ranch's cottage, which appears to be nothing more than a tumbled-down shack. But they are not discouraged and think of all the wonderful things that will happen next.

The next morning, as Jim is building a fence by chopping wood, Benson comes by and warns him of a giant grizzly bear called Satan, who is notorious for invading ranches and killing livestock just for fun, and that many have tried to shoot him but have failed. In addition, the Currys come by. Jed tries to persuade Jim to sell the land to him, but he refuses.

Jim goes back to town the next day and asks Wilhelmina Peterson, who owns the general store, if she knows where he can buy some cattle to breed with his prize bull Duncan. She asks her sidekick Hank to bring Jim to Hazel Squires' place. There, Hazel tells Jim that she can sell some cattle for a buck each. When she goes to the hog pen to check on the pigs, she finds them all missing or dead, which was the work of Satan.

During the night, Satan makes his initial appearance at the Cole place, killing Duncan, causing Sam's mule to run away, and badly injuring the family's dog . The next morning, while waiting for the doctor to finish stitching up the dog, Jim and Meg go to the general store for coffee. Unfortunately, the Curry boys are also there with cohorts and start harassing Jim. They eventually get into a fight, with the Curry sons driven out. Jed arrives and chastises his sons, telling them not to antagonize Jim any more if they are to get his ranch.

Needing a replacement bull but with no cash to buy one, Jim is compelled to get a loan from the bank, giving Benson various possessions like his saddle and gold sheriff star as collateral. He goes to the Squires ranch to purchase the bull as well as cattle for breeding. When Jed learns of the loan, he warns Benson not to do it again and reminds Benson that he, as the major stockholder of the bank, had the authority to do this.

While doing work on the farm, the Coles and Sam see Sam's mule appear. However, it is badly-injured, dying just a few minutes later. Sam grieves for his loss, and both he and Jim vow to hunt Satan and kill him.

As Jim and Sam track Satan through the woods, they are attacked and nearly killed, escaping by jumping off a cliff into a lake. As the Coles return home from a dance social, they find that Satan has killed most of their cattle. Again, Jim goes to Benson for a loan to buy replacement animals, but this time, Benson apologetically refuses his request, fearing Jed's wrath. Satan's depredations on livestock have reached a crisis point, and Jed posts a $750 reward for anyone who can kill the bear. In response to the offer of a reward, a bounty hunter named Cass Dowdy shows up in town with hunting dogs. Jim remembers he had sent Cass to jail for two years for murder. Cass has decided to hunt Satan for the reward money just to make sure Jim won't get it and thus ruin him financially.

Jim and Sam set a trap for Satan. The men carelessly doze off while waiting, and while they are doing so, Satan attacks again, driving off one of the horses and killing Sam, who with his dying breath urges Jim to continue the hunt. Dowdy's dogs, which had run off the previous night, are also killed by Satan. More traps are set up for Satan, but with no success. One night, Dowdy visits one of Jim's traps with the intention of sabotaging it but is accidentally injured instead. The next morning, the two meet again, with Jim realizing what Cass did, and the two have a fight, with Jim coming off the winner and leaving Cass there.

At home, Angela tells Jim that she no longer wants to live here and will leave Jim if he continues to hunt Satan. She eventually calms down when he says he is killing the grizzly just to protect his family. The next morning, he is stunned to find that Charlie has gone after Satan himself. Jim decides to follow Charlie into the woods while Angela apologizes for her anger.

In the woods, Jim once again runs into Dowdy, who almost kills him, but Jim fights back and drives him away. Night comes, and Satan attacks Charlie and chases him up a tree. As Jim arrives, Charlie jumps out of the tree and distracts Satan, while Dowdy fires at the bear to save the boy, but is fatally mauled. Jim had been under cover. Finally having stabbed Satan, injuring him Jim gets out of cover and shoots Satan, killing him at last. After comforting a dying Dowdy, who gave his life to save Charlie's, Jim and Charlie return home and rejoice with the others.

Cast 

Clint Walker as Jim Cole
Martha Hyer as Angela Cole
Keenan Wynn as Jed Curry
Nancy Kulp as Wilhelmina Peterson
Candy Moore as Meg
Kevin Brodie as Charlie Cole
Ellen Corby as Hazel Squires
Jack Elam as Hank
Leo Gordon as Cass Dowdy
Ron Ely as Tad Curry
Sammy Jackson as Cal Curry
Med Flory as Duke Squires
Don Haggerty as Sam Potts
Regis Toomey as Cotton Benson
Victoria Paige Meyerink as Gypsy Cole
Warren Douglas as the Minister

Comic book adaption
 Dell Movie Classic: The Night of the Grizzly (December 1966)

References

External links 

1966 films
1966 Western (genre) films
Paramount Pictures films
Films adapted into comics
Films about bears
Films directed by Joseph Pevney
Films scored by Leith Stevens
Films shot in Big Bear Lake, California
American Western (genre) films
1960s English-language films
1960s American films